Rareș Andrei Mandache (born 2 October 1987) is a Romanian professional basketball player, who currently plays for the  Dinamo București of the Liga Națională.

International career
He represented Romania's national basketball team at the 2015 Eurobasket qualification. Mandache was also part of the roster of Romania at EuroBasket 2017.

References

External links
Eurobasket.com Profile
FIBA.com profile
Real GM Profile

1987 births
Living people
CS Universitatea Cluj-Napoca (men's basketball) players
CSM Oradea (basketball) players
Keravnos B.C. players
Romanian men's basketball players
Point guards
Shooting guards
Sportspeople from Arad, Romania